Kelly Salchow (born October 5, 1973 in Cincinnati, Ohio) is an American rower. She competed in women's quadruple sculls at the 2000 Summer Olympics and the 2004 Summer Olympics.

References  
 
 

1973 births
Living people
American female rowers
Sportspeople from Cincinnati
Olympic rowers of the United States
Rowers at the 2000 Summer Olympics
Rowers at the 2004 Summer Olympics
21st-century American women